Feyzabad (also Romanized as Feyẕābād and Faiz Abad) is a village in Rahmatabad Rural District, Zarqan District, Shiraz County, Fars Province, Iran. At the 2006 census, its population was 124, in 31 families.

References 

Populated places in Zarqan County